Fruman is a surname. Notable people with the surname include:

 Igor Fruman (born 1966), Soviet-born American businessman
 Menachem Fruman (1945–2013), Israeli Orthodox rabbi
 Orly Fruman (born 1955), Israeli politician

See also
 Froman